Cranes Nest and Crane Nest may refer to:
Crane Nest, Kentucky
Cranes Nest, Virginia
Cranes Nest River, Virginia